The proven oil reserves in Venezuela are recognized as the largest in the world, totaling  as of 1 January 2014. The 2019 edition of the BP Statistical Review of World Energy reports the total proved reserves of 303.3 billion barrels for Venezuela (slightly more than Saudi Arabia's 297.7 billion barrels).

Venezuela's crude oil is very heavy by international standards, and as a result much of it must be processed by specialized domestic and international refineries.

History 
Venezuela's development of its oil reserves has been affected by political unrest. In late 2002, nearly half of the workers at the state oil company PDVSA went on strike, after which the company fired 18,000 of them, draining the company of technical knowledge and expertise.

Growth 

The energy and oil ministry said it had certified an additional  of proven reserves in the country's Faja del Orinoco region. By 2009, Venezuela reported  of conventional oil reserves, the largest of any country in South America. When 2015 ended, Venezuela's confirmed oil reserves were estimated to be around 300.9 billion barrels in total.

In 2010 Venezuela reportedly produced 3.1 million barrels of oil daily and exporting 2.4 million of those barrels per day. Such oils exports brought in $61 billion for Venezuela. However, Venezuela only owned about $10.5 billion in foreign reserves, meaning that its debt remained at $7.2 billion when 2015 rang out.

Collapse 
After the 2014 oil crash, "Venezuela descended into chaos with hyperinflation, severe shortages of most goods, fighting on the streets, and many people fleeing to other countries." Venezuela owned the Citgo gasoline chain, but U.S. sanctions as of 2019 prevent Venezuela from receiving economic benefit from Citgo. In 2019, it was among the oil export countries who had lost the most from energy transition; it was ranked 151 out of 156 countries in the index of Geopolitical Gains and Losses (GeGaLo).

Venezuela's oil exports were "expected to net about $2.3 billion" by the end of 2020, whereas a decade earlier the country had been "the largest producer in Latin America, earning about $90 billion a year" from these exports. A New York Times article noted that, in October 2020, "for the first time in a century, there are no rigs searching for oil in Venezuela."

Orinoco Belt 

In addition to conventional oil, Venezuela has oil sands deposits similar in size to those of Canada, and approximately equal to the world's reserves of conventional oil. Venezuela's Orinoco oil sands are less viscous than Canada's Athabasca oil sands – meaning they can be produced by more conventional means – but they are buried too deep to be extracted by surface mining.

According to the USGS, the Orinoco Belt alone is estimated to contain 900– of heavy crude in proven and unproven deposits.  Of this, the USGS estimated that 380– could be technically recoverable, which would make Venezuela's total recoverable reserves (proven and unproven) among the largest in the world.  The technology needed to recover ultra-heavy crude oil, such as in most of the Orinoco Belt, may be much more complex and expensive than that of Saudi Arabia's light oil industry. The USGS did not make any attempt to determine how much oil in the Orinoco Belt is economically recoverable. Unless the price of crude rises, it is likely that the proven reserves will have to be adjusted downward.

Comparison to Saudi Arabia

In early 2011, then-president Hugo Chávez and the Venezuelan government announced that the nation's oil reserves had surpassed that of the previous long-term world leader, Saudi Arabia.

While Venezuela has reported "proven reserves" topping those reported by Saudi Arabia, industry analyst Robert Rapier has suggested that these numbers reflect variables driven by changes in crude oil market prices—indicating that the percentage of Venezuela's oil that qualifies as Venezuela's "proven" reserves may be driven up or down by the global market price for crude oil.

According to Rapier, Venezuela's oil reserves are largely of "extra-heavy crude oil" which might "not be economical to produce" under certain market conditions. (Reuters columnst John Kemp reports that Venezuela's "very dense crudes... are complicated to process," and are priced at a "large discount," when compared to the crudes of other producers.) Rapier notes that the near-quadrupling of Venezuela's claimed "proven" reserves, between 2005 and 2014—from 80 Gbbl to 300 Gbbl—may have been due to soaring crude oil prices that made Venezuela's normally uneconomical heavier crude suddenly market-viable to produce, and thus elevating it to within Venezuela's "proven" reserves. Consequently, Rapier contends, periods of lower crude oil market prices may remove those reserves from the "proven" category—placing Venezuela's viable "proven reserves" well below Saudi Arabia's.

By comparison, Rapier contends, the lighter crude generally associated with Saudi oil fields is cost-effective to produce under most market-price conditions, and thus is more consistently, and uniformly, part of Saudi Arabia's "proven" reserves, compared to the more variable usefulness of the Venezuelan oil.

References 

Geology of Venezuela
Venezuela
Petroleum in Venezuela